Staghorn Flat is a rural locality in the Yackandandah Valley of north east Victoria, situated between Wodonga and Yackandandah. It is shared between the Shire of Indigo and the City of Wodonga.  At the 2016 Census Staghorn Flat had a population of 293.

References

External links
Gold and Gumboots

Towns in Victoria (Australia)
Shire of Indigo
City of Wodonga